Milton Neil Campbell (January 21, 1881 – November 11, 1965) was a Canadian politician. He represented the electoral district of Mackenzie from 1921 to 1933, in the House of Commons of Canada. He resigned from the House of Commons in 1933 to accept an appointment as vice-chairman of the Tariff Board of Canada, a position that he held until 1943.

He was a member of the Progressive Party of Canada and joined the Ginger Group of radical MPs.

References

 Canadian Political History 1800-2000 by Joshua Paul Howlett

External links
 

1881 births
1965 deaths
Members of the House of Commons of Canada from Saskatchewan
Progressive Party of Canada MPs
Ginger Group MPs